Kian Shay Harratt (born 21 June 2002) is an English professional footballer who plays as a striker for  club Huddersfield Town. He has previously played on loan at Harrogate Town, Guiseley, Port Vale and Bradford City. He helped Port Vale to win promotion out of League Two via the play-offs in 2022.

Early and personal life
Harratt was born in Pontefract, West Yorkshire and raised in nearby Hemsworth. On 1 November 2022, Harratt was fined £830 and ordered to pay £150 in costs and a victim surcharge of £83 after being convicted of taking part in hare coursing with two accomplices.

Career
Harratt played for junior club Upton United and was at the academies at Barnsley and Leeds United, before signing for Huddersfield Town at under-17 level after impressing during a trial spell. He scored 32 goals in 47 games for the under-17 and under-19 teams in the 2018–19 season. He made his Championship debut in a 2–0 defeat to West Yorkshire derby rivals Leeds United at Kirklees Stadium on 7 December 2019; manager Danny Cowley played him as a 72nd-minute substitute for Josh Koroma.

Harratt joined National League club Harrogate Town on a one-month loan starting on 17 January 2020. He picked up an assist for Alex Bradley on his first start for the club, in a 2–0 victory over Eastleigh in the FA Trophy at Wetherby Road; manager Simon Weaver stated that "his energy output and his movement caused Eastleigh a lot of problems... you can see he is going to get a lot of goals in his career". The loan was extended, though the 2019–20 season was curtailed early due to the COVID-19 pandemic in England, and he returned to Harrogate for the play-offs in July. He was an unused substitute in the play-off final at Wembley Stadium, where Harrogate secured a place in the English Football League with victory over Notts County.

Harratt joined National League North side Guiseley on loan on 24 October 2020, on a loan intended to last until 3 January 2021, but was recalled by Huddersfield manager Carlos Corberán on 15 December. He signed an extended contract in December 2021, to keep him at the club until June 2025, with an additional year option.

He joined League Two club Port Vale on loan on 7 January 2022, until the end of the 2021–22 season, where he would be reunited with former Huddersfield academy coach Dean Whitehead. Huddersfield's Head of Football Operations Leigh Bromby stated that "it was clear from our conversations how much they wanted the player and the role they envisage for him". He scored with a diving header on making his debut the following day, having come on as a substitute in a 4–1 defeat to Premier League club Brentford in an FA Cup third round game at Vale Park. Manager Darrell Clarke said after the game that "he has got a bit about him... we are really pleased and thankful to Huddersfield for allowing [the loan]". Harratt went on to also score on his league debut for the "Valiants" in a 3–1 defeat to Swindon Town on 15 January. On 15 March, he came of the bench to score a brace in a 3–1 home win over Mansfield Town, receiving a booking for taking his shirt off during the first goal celebration, and was compared to a young Billy Sharp by acting manager Andy Crosby. He started in the play-off final at Wembley Stadium as Vale secured promotion with a 3–0 victory over Mansfield Town; Michael Baggaley of The Sentinel wrote that "The Stags defence couldn't handle him" and that he "put Vale in front with a diving header and was only denied a second by the offside flag".

On 2 June 2022, he returned to League Two after agreeing to join Huddersfield's West Yorkshire derby rivals Bradford City on loan for the entirety of the 2022–23 season. Manager Mark Hughes said that: "Kian has a big personality and a real drive to succeed, so we are looking forward to seeing how he fares at Valley Parade." He made his club debut as a substitute on 30 July, and was sent off deep into stoppage time following an altercation with Doncaster Rovers goalkeeper Jonathan Mitchell as Bradford recorded a 0–0 home draw. He received a three-match ban following the incident. His father spoke out on social media in September to complain of his son's lack of game time at the club. On 4 November 2022, Harratt's loan at Bradford was terminated and he returned to Huddersfield, following his criminal conviction for hare coursing.

Style of play
Harratt is an intelligent striker with a strong physical presence and good movement.

Career statistics

Honours
Harrogate Town
National League play-offs: 2020

Port Vale
EFL League Two play-offs: 2022

References

2002 births
Living people
Sportspeople from Pontefract
People from Hemsworth
Footballers from West Yorkshire
English footballers
Association football forwards
Barnsley F.C. players
Leeds United F.C. players
Huddersfield Town A.F.C. players
Harrogate Town A.F.C. players
Guiseley A.F.C. players
Port Vale F.C. players
Bradford City A.F.C. players
English Football League players
National League (English football) players
People convicted of cruelty to animals